Will Carpenter (born July 4, 1956) is an American politician and businessman serving as a member of the Kansas House of Representatives from the 75th district. Elected in November 2018, he assumed office in January 2019.

Early life and education 
Carpenter was born in Hamilton, Kansas, in 1956.

Career 
Outside of politics, Carpenter has owned several small businesses, including a car wash, market, and storage facility. He represented the 75th district in the Kansas House of Representatives from 2013 to 2017. In August 2016, Carpenter was defeated for re-election in the Republican primary. He was re-elected to his old seat in November 2018. Since 2019, he has served as chair of the House Social Services Budget Committee.

References 

1956 births
Living people
People from Greenwood County, Kansas
People from El Dorado, Kansas
Businesspeople from Kansas
Republican Party members of the Kansas House of Representatives
People from Butler County, Kansas